Grand Magazine, stylized as GRAND, is an American quarterly lifestyle magazine which publishes content related to grandparents and their families. It is based in Gulf Port, Florida, the United States.

History 
Grand Magazine was founded by Christine Crosby in 2004, and her husband, Jonathan Micocciin in Florida, the United States.

In October 2004, the first issue of magazine was published with Billy Crystal on the cover page.

In 2006, the circulation of the magazine expanded to 100,000 readers. In July 2006, Wall Street Journal reported that Grand had converted about half of its 100,000 readers into subscribers.

In 2009, the magazine started publishing digital version of the magazine.

Grandparent of the Year 
 Harrison Ford (2005)
 Tony Danza (2006)
 Naomi Judd (2007)
 Phil McGraw (2010)
 Martha Stewart (2012)
 Valerie Wood-Gaiger (2019)

References 

Lifestyle magazines
Magazines established in 2004
2004 establishments in Florida